Cut Throat City is a 2020 American heist film directed by RZA from a screenplay by Paul Cuschieri. The film stars Shameik Moore, T.I., Demetrius Shipp Jr., Kat Graham, Wesley Snipes, Terrence Howard, Eiza González and Ethan Hawke.

Cut Throat City was released in the United States on August 21, 2020, by Well Go USA Entertainment. The film received positive reviews from critics.

Plot
In 2005 New Orleans, four friends; Blink, Miracle, Andre, and Junior prepare for Blink's wedding to Demyra. Hurricane Katrina soon decimates the city. Some time later, Blink, an aspiring artist who is working on a graphic novel he calls "Cut Throat City", is denied a chance to publish his work and becomes disgruntled. Residing in the crime stricken Lower Ninth Ward, he and his friends struggle with poverty. Blink and Demyra apply for FEMA aid and are denied. Blink suggests he and his friends meet with Demyra's cousin, Lorenzo Bass, a local drug lord.

Bass offers them a job to rob a casino. During the heist, security arrives and a shootout ensues. The group escapes but is tailed by the police and Andre is killed. The group pays a local Reverend to help them dispose of Andre's body. The trio present themselves to Bass with their $20,000 in earnings who informs them that the news reported they escaped with $150,000 and refuses to negotiate. Bass orders Blink to "walk the plank" by exposing his penis to a caged raccoon, but Junior uses a dog whistle to call his Rottweiler. The dog attacks Bass as the trio fight his henchmen. Bass kills the dog and prepares to shoot Blink but is out of ammunition and the trio escape. Meanwhile, Detective Lucinda Valencia is assigned to investigate the casino robbery.

The trio stay at the home of Blink's hermit father, Lawrence. Blink suggests they ask crime lord, The Saint, for help. Det. Valencia meets with the corrupt Det. Courtney who offers her little assistance but she soon learns that Bass set the group up as he has inside connections to the casino. Meanwhile Demyra is threatened by Bass, and so she meets with Alderman Jackson Symms, whose wife she provided hospice services for, and he agrees to help. He meets with Det. Courtney and asks him to deliver the information and a payment to The Saint. Det. Valencia meets with Blink after finding his bloody clothing and a poker chip. However, she has a change of heart after learning the reality of the situation from Symms.

Blink, Miracle, and Junior rob local businesses in an attempt to make quick cash and attract the attention of The Saint. They are successful but Lawrence finds their money and forces the group to leave. They visit a strip club where they flash their earnings and are taken prisoner by Det. Courtney and his men. They are delivered to The Saint who is impressed with the trio and allows them to live in exchange for cash. They return to the Ninth Ward and Det. Valencia concludes her investigation, urging Blink to pursue his artistic dreams instead of a life of crime. Symms and The Saint meet to discuss the situation. Soon after, Bass presents himself to The Saint who shoots him in the head.

Some time later, the trio continue to find themselves in poverty. Blink proposes they rob a FEMA office but the robbery goes wrong when Miracle kills a security guard. The police swarm the building and all three men are seemingly killed in the ensuing firefight. However, Blink is revealed to have survived and shown at the publishing of his graphic novel where Valencia congratulates him and he thanks her for giving him a second chance.

During the ending credits, Symms meets with Courtney at the grave of Andre where he shoots him dead and appoints Miracle as the new overseer of the Lower Ninth.

Cast

Production

Casting
In December 2017, it was announced Terrence Howard, Wesley Snipes, T.I., Eiza González, Demetrius Shipp Jr. Shameik Moore, Joel David Moore, Kat Graham, Rob Morgan, Keean Johnson, Denzel Whitaker, Isaiah Washington and Sam Daly had joined the cast of the film, with RZA directing from a screenplay by Paul Cuschieri, with Elliott Michael Smith p.g.a., William Clevinger p.g.a., Sean Lydiard p.g.a., Michael Mendelson, Kyle Tekiela serving as producers; (Rumble Riot Pictures, Patriot Pictures and XYZ Films banners, respectively). In December 2018, Ethan Hawke joined the cast of the film.

Filming
Principal photography began in December 2017, in New Orleans, Louisiana.

Release

Theatrical
In June 2018, Well Go USA Entertainment acquired distribution rights to the film. It was scheduled to have its world premiere at South by Southwest on March 14, 2020.  However, the festival was cancelled due to the COVID-19 pandemic. It was then rescheduled to be released on April 10, 2020. However, it was pulled from the schedule due to the pandemic. It was then rescheduled for July 17, later delayed to July 31, 2020, and delayed once more to August 21, 2020.

Reception

Box office 
The film made $240,000 from 407 theaters in its opening weekend.

Critical response 
The website's critics consensus reads: "An evolution for director RZA, Cut Throat City overcomes occasionally muddled storytelling on the strength of its raw, infectious energy." On Metacritic, the film has a weighted average score of 67 out of 100, based on 11 critics, indicating "generally favorable reviews".

References

External links
 
 
 

2020 crime drama films
2020s heist films
American crime drama films
American heist films
Fictional portrayals of the New Orleans Police Department
Films about Hurricane Katrina
Films directed by RZA
Films postponed due to the COVID-19 pandemic
Films set in 2005
Films set in New Orleans
Films shot in New Orleans
Hood films
2020s English-language films
2020s American films